The Borland–Clifford House, also known as the Clifford House, is a historic Carpenter Gothic house located at 339 Ralston Street in Reno, Washoe County, Nevada. The house is one of the few extant houses in Reno which were built in the 19th century.

History 
Built in 1885 by James Borland, it remained in his ownership until 1902. It 1907 it was bought by O. J. Clifford and it remained in his family until 1984 and is still in private ownership. On March 7, 1983, it was added to the National Register of Historic Places as the Clifford House. On June 24, 2008, additional documentation was added to include Borland's name in the listing title.

Location 
The house was one of the first houses to be built in the Reno's Western Addition Neighborhood. It has been moved several times, to places including Ralston, 4th street, Arlington Avenue, and Plumb Lane.

In 2018, the house was disassembled and moved to downtown Reno.

Ownership 
In 2018, the house was purchased by Jacobs Entertainment for 720,000 dollars. The company later sold the house to Archie Granata for 10 dollars.

References

Houses on the National Register of Historic Places in Nevada
Carpenter Gothic architecture in Nevada
Houses completed in 1885
National Register of Historic Places in Reno, Nevada
Houses in Reno, Nevada
Carpenter Gothic houses in the United States